For the Future (ZM) is a political party in Ukraine directly supported by the oligarch Ihor Kolomoyskyi. The party was originally registered in July 2008 as Ukraine of the Future. During the 2010 local elections, the party only took part in Dnipropetrovsk Oblast, but it participates nationwide since the 2012 Ukrainian parliamentary election.

In October 2019 the party was renamed "For the Future". The party was renamed and taken over by the parliamentary group "For the Future", with 23 initial members, that was established in the Verkhovna Rada (Ukraine's parliament) on 29 August 2019 following the July 2019 Ukrainian parliamentary election.

History

Ukraine of the Future

The party was created in December 2007. In 2012 Ukraine of the Future became member of the Liberal International, although at some point in the mid- to late-2010s it was delisted.

During the 2010 Ukrainian local elections the party won 4 representatives in the Dnipropetrovsk Oblast Council (regional parliament) and 4 seats in the city council of Dnipropetrovsk. In the simultaneously held elected for Dnipro Mayor the parties candidate, Sviatoslav Oliynyk, finished second with 16.1%. (He lost this election to Ivan Kulichenko of Party of Regions who scored 40,1%.) Oliynyk is a former BYuT lawmaker.

In the 2012 parliamentary elections the party did not spend anything on campaigning and but still managed to take the 15th place among the 21 parties who participated on the nationwide list with 0.18% of the votes. But since their win was far below the 5% election threshold and they won no constituencies (party had competed in 17 constituencies) they thus failed to win parliamentary representation. Oliynyk headed the party list of the party during these elections.
The party did participate in the 2014 Ukrainian parliamentary election, and again did not win seats. The party did not participate in the 2015 Ukrainian local elections.

The party did not participate in the July 2019 Ukrainian parliamentary election.

For the Future

Following the 2019 Ukrainian parliamentary election a parliamentary group "For the Future", with initial 23 members, was established in the Verkhovna Rada (Ukraine's parliament) on 29 August 2019. In May 2020 deputies from this group announced the creation of a party of the same name. This "new party" is legally a continuation of "Ukraine of the Future" that was renamed in October 2019 "For the Future". In May 2020 lawmaker Ihor Palytsia was elected chairman of the party. According to Palytsia the party is de facto a continuation of UKROP following its transformation. The party announced in the summer of 2020 it intended to take part in the October 2020 Ukrainian local elections. On 30 July 2020 Cherkasy mayor Anatoliy Bondarenko joined the party.

According to an analysis by Ukrainian NGO  by September 2020 Ihor Kolomoisky's 1+1 media group was actively promoting For the Future.

In the 2020 Ukrainian local elections For the Future managed to win several mayoral wins and won seats on many local councils. However compared with the large money it had invested in the election campaign its result was underwhelming. (Cherkasy mayor Bondarenko was reelected.) 3,773 people won seats in local councils on behalf of the party, that is about 11.42% of the available seats.

On 8 October 2021, one of the party's MPs Anton Polyakov died.

Election results

Parliamentary elections

References

External links
Official website

Liberal parties in Ukraine
Political parties established in 2008
2008 establishments in Ukraine
21st-century Ukrainian politicians